The Compagnie des chemins de fer de Paris à Lyon et à la Méditerranée ("Railway Company of Paris to Lyon and the Mediterranean"), also known as the Chemins de fer Paris-Lyon-Méditerranée or simply PLM, established in 1857, was one of France’s main railway companies until the nationalization of all French railways and establishment of the Société nationale des chemins de fer français (SNCF) on .

History

Established on 3 July 1857, the PLM grew between 1858 and 1862 from the amalgamation of the earlier Paris–Lyon and Lyon–Méditerranée companies, as well as subsequently incorporating a number of smaller railways. The PLM operated chiefly in the Southeast of France, with a main line which connected Paris to the French Riviera by way of Dijon, Lyon and Marseille. The company was also the operator of railways in Algeria.

The PLM was absorbed in 1938 into the majority state-owned Société nationale des chemins de fer français, and its network became the southeastern region of the SNCF.

Artworks
The PLM commissioned poster artist Roger Broders, sponsoring his travel to the French Riviera and the French Alps so he could visit the subjects of his work. Lithographs of travel posters Broders rendered for PLM are still available commercially. Several of their draughtsmen went on to notable careers, including Alfred Grévin and David Dellepiane.

Headquarters in Paris

The PLM head office was the most opulent headquarters building of any of the French railway companies. It was built in the late 1860s on the former grounds of the Tivoli Garden, with main entrance at 88, rue Saint-Lazare. 

The SNCF head office remained there until 1999 when it moved to a new building next to the Gare Montparnasse. The former PLM building was subsequently purchased by the insurance arm of Crédit Agricole, renovated under plans by architect Anthony Béchu, and branded  with reference to the site's pre-railway history. From 2003 it became an office of AXA then, from 2014, the head office of insurer Covéa.

See also
 Baron Barlatier de Mas
 Chemins de fer du Nord
 Chemins de fer de l'Est
 Chemins de fer de l'Ouest
 Compagnie du chemin de fer de Paris à Orléans
 Chemins de fer de l'État

References

External links
 

Railway companies of France
French companies established in 1858
Railway companies established in 1858